A Good Time is the second studio album by Nigerian singer Davido. It was released on November 22, 2019, through Davido Music Worldwide, RCA Records and Sony Music. The album features guest appearances from Chris Brown, Summer Walker, Gunna, A Boogie wit da Hoodie, Dremo, Peruzzi, Popcaan, Zlatan, Yonda, Wurld and Naira Marley. Davido enlisted Speroach Beatz, Tekno, Shizzi, Kiddominant, P2J, London on da Track, Fresh VDM, Seyi, Teekay Witty, Ray Keys and Vstix to produce the album. In December 2019, Davido announced a North American tour in support of the album; the tour was scheduled to begin in the winter and end in spring 2020. In March 2020, Davido postponed the tour due to the ongoing COVID-19 pandemic.

Background
Davido recorded A Good Time in Atlanta. He told Vibe magazine he wanted to record in a new environment. He described the album as a body of work for everybody and said it would be predominantly Afrobeats, but would incorporate elements of other genres. Davido disclosed the album's title during an event held in Lagos in September 2019, and said it would be released the following month. Davido also unveiled snippets of four songs from the album during the event. Following his performance at Powerhouse 2019, Davido spoke with Power 105.1's DJ Self and said the album will feature collaborations with Summer Walker, Gunna, A Boogie and Chris Brown, among others. A Good Time was produced entirely by Nigerian producers, except for one track. The album's cover art features Davido, his father and a sculpture of his late mother.

Singles
The album's lead single "If" was released on February 17, 2017. It was produced by Tekno, who supposedly ghost wrote the track for Davido. The song was certified diamond by the Recording Industry of South Africa, indicating shipments of 200,000 units. "If" won Best Pop Single and Song of the Year at The Headies 2018. Reviewing for OkayAfrica, Sabo Kpade described the song as a "slow burner" with an "unfussy beat that sounds hollowed out and isn't cluttered with instruments". The music video for "If" was recorded in London; it was directed by Director Q and produced by Tunde Babalola. The former has worked with Burna Boy and Ycee, while the latter produced "Skelewu", "Wanted", "Bobo" and "Antenna". Davido teamed up with menswear designer Orange Culture to release a capsule collection inspired by "If".

The album's second single "Fall" was released on June 2, 2017. It samples a line from Kojo Funds's "Dun Talking". The song was certified platinum by the Recording Industry of South Africa. "Fall" was one of the top-100-most-Shazam-searched singles in America in January 2019, and was a top-10 record on Shazam in New York. In February 2019, it became the longest charting Nigerian pop song in Billboard history. "Fall" was ranked at number 163 on Pitchforks list of the 200 Best Songs of the 2010s. The accompanying music video for "Fall" was directed by Nigerian-born British video director Daps. In December 2018, the video surpassed 100 million views, becoming the most viewed video by a Nigerian artist on YouTube.

"Assurance" was released on April 30, 2018, as the album's third single. It samples Paw Paw's "Biggie Biggie". The song was produced by Speroach Beatz and has been described as a love track. Davido dedicated "Assurance" to his girlfriend and released it to coincide with her 23rd birthday. In an interview with Konbini Channels, Speroach Beatz said he made the beat in an hour and that Davido spent 30 minutes recording the song. Reviewing for Native magazine, Toye Sokunbi said the song "speaks volumes for the importance of clarity in the age of emojis, validation from our loved ones and putting love first, against all odds". The accompanying music video for "Assurance" was directed by Meji Alabi.

The Chris Brown-assisted track "Blow My Mind" was released on July 26, 2019, as the album's fourth single. Produced by Shizzi, it was initially intended to be released as the album's lead single. Musically, "Blow My Mind" contains lyrics pertaining to a girl who simply blows Davido's mind. In the Edgar Esteves-directed visuals for "Blow My Mind", Davido and Chris Brown spend quality time in a motel with their significant other. The video amassed one million views in 11 hours, surpassing Wizkid's "Fever" and "Come Closer" to become the fastest Nigerian music video to achieve this feat. It also became the Nigerian music video with the highest number of views within the first 24 hours of its release.

The album's fifth single "Risky" was released on October 23, 2019. It features guest vocals by Jamaican singer Popcaan, who previously enlisted Davido to appear on his 2018 single "Dun Rich". The visuals for "Risky" was directed by Meji Alabi and pays homage to the crime drama series Top Boy. In the video, a female member of Davido's and Popcaan's crew informs upon them to police.

Other releases
On December 19, 2019, Davido released the Meji Alabi-directed music video for "Sweet in the Middle". It features clips of an arid Lagos landscape and post-apocalyptic scenes that are reminiscent of Mad Max films.

On March 3, 2020, Davido released the visuals for "1 Milli"; it was directed by Director K and depicts a wedding celebration between Davido and his fiancé. The video contains a ceremonial scene of a middle-aged woman who rides a horseback while dressed in a traditional attire. It was criticized for bearing a striking resemblance to Entitled, a 2018 short film by Nigerian-British filmmaker Adeyemi Michael. Director K clarified on Instagram that he was inspired by Michael's work and wanted to "recreate the iconic shot of Michael's mother on horseback".

On April 23, 2020, Davido released the Daps-directed music video for "D&G". In it, he and Summer Walker are decked from head-to-toe in Dolce & Gabbana clothing. The video was shot in Los Angeles while Davido was on his North American tour. Davido told CNN that all proceeds from the "D&G" video will support the Dolce & Gabbana and Humanitas Together for Coronavirus Research Fund.

Critical reception

Tara Joshi of The Guardian awarded the album 3 stars out of 5, commending Davido for offering a "broader array of sonic palettes". Joshi also wrote that the album "can drift into sunshine-infused listlessness, but it’s rescued by Davido’s undeniable charisma and intricate understanding of warm, uplifting pop instrumentation". Pitchforks Sheldon Pearce granted the album 8.3 stars out of 10, describing it as a "buoyant, unsinkable record" and applauding Davido for providing "not just an integrated sound all his own but a clear vision for its future".

Toye Sokunbi of Native magazine said that from a sonic standpoint, the album "emblemises Davido's resolute Africa-first creative gaze while expending a wide-range of collaborators as homage to afropop's expansive inspirations and influences". Also reviewing for Native magazine, Debola Abimbolu said A Good Time relieved Davido from the "pressure of delivering songs that instantly resonate as club bangers". Abimbolu also opined that all five singles "lose some of their gloss when they all run together and are padded out with different versions of the same piano-heavy afropop beat".

In a mixed review for Pulse Nigeria, Motolani Alake felt the album "lacks the presence of multiple groundbreaking and mind-blowing songs" despite being cohesive. TooXclusive's Oluwatobi Ibironke gave the album 7 stars out of 10, echoing similar sentiments made by Alake. Arthur Shur of Jaguda gave the album 6 stars out of 10, describing the listening experience as "a physics wave motion". Shur also said the album is "average" when previously released singles are omitted.

Track listing
Credits adapted from Native magazine and Modern Ghana.

Notes
"If" samples lyrics from Lagbaja's "Gra Gra", a song from the album WE (2000).

Charts

Release history

References

2019 albums
Davido albums
Yoruba-language albums
Albums produced by Shizzi
Albums produced by Kiddominant
Albums produced by London on da Track
Albums produced by Tekno